Arbat is a pedestrian zone located at the Beibitshilik Avenue in Shymkent, Kazakhstan. It was opened in June 2018 at the eve of Capital City Day. There are benches and bike paths in the zone as well as about 700 seedlings of spruce, chestnut, white birch and 1000 roses are planted.

References 

Streets in Shymkent
Pedestrian streets in Shymkent
Tourist attractions in Shymkent